Muhammad Abdul Razzaq (born 1921) is a Pakistani field hockey player. He competed in the 1948 Summer Olympics.

References

External links
 

1921 births
Possibly living people
Field hockey players at the 1948 Summer Olympics
Pakistani male field hockey players
Olympic field hockey players of Pakistan
Field hockey players from Faisalabad
20th-century Pakistani people